Nicholas Charles Phillips (born 10 May 1974) is a former English cricketer. He was a right-handed batsman and a right-arm offbreak bowler. He played first-class cricket between 1993 and 2003 for Sussex and Durham in a career that lasted ten years. He played Twenty20 cricket in 2003, before joining Northumberland in 2005 in the Minor Counties Championship.

Phillips also played extensively for the Durham and Sussex Second XI's, particularly in representing them throughout Second XI trophies of the 90s and early 2000s. He had previously played two youth Test Matches for England Under-19s against the West Indian Under-19s in 1993.

External links
Nick Phillips at Cricket Archive 

1974 births
Living people
English cricketers
Sussex cricketers
Durham cricketers
Northumberland cricketers